Utufua is a village in Wallis and Futuna. It is located in Mua District on the south coast of Wallis Island. Its population according to the 2018 census was 602 people.

References

Populated places in Wallis and Futuna